WDNO (960 AM) is a radio station broadcasting a Contemporary Christian format. Licensed to Quebradillas, Puerto Rico, the station is currently owned by New Life Broadcasting. WDNO is simulcast on W250CF 97.9 FM in Arecibo and W283DR 104.5 FM in Aguadilla.

History
The station was assigned the call letters WJYT on 1982-06-28. On 1988-07-07, the station changed its call sign to WORR, on 1992-09-28 to WKVN, on 2004-07-06 to WCHQ, and on 2011-01-19 to the current WDNO.

Ownership
In July 2003, International Broadcasting Corp. (Angel Roman, president) reached an agreement to buy two radio stations, WRSJ and WKVN (now WDNO), from Concillio Mision Cristiano Fuente de Agua Viva Inc. (Otoniel Font, president) for a reported sale price of $1.45 million.

Since October 1, 2016 and after 29 years broadcasting in the frequency 103.7 FM, WDNO and the translator station with the approval of the Federal Communications Commission in the United States, has changed to 97.9 FM for best coverage. In March 2018, The station announced that the FM translator in Arecibo will move the frequency to 98.3 FM in the next few months and the callsign will change to W252EA, pending FCC approval, But the translator remain itself on the same frequency (97.9 MHz) and with the same call letters (W250CF).

Translator stations

References

External links

 
 

DNO
Radio stations established in 1985
1985 establishments in Puerto Rico
Quebradillas, Puerto Rico